A by-election was held for the New South Wales Legislative Assembly electorate of The Bogan on 31 May 1892 because of the death of George Cass.

Dates

Results

George Cass died.

See also
Electoral results for the district of The Bogan
List of New South Wales state by-elections

Notes

References

The Bogan
New South Wales state by-elections
1890s in New South Wales